The 1968 UTEP Miners football team was an American football team that represented the University of Texas at El Paso as a member of the Western Athletic Conference (WAC) during the 1968 NCAA University Division football season. In its fourth season under head coach Bobby Dobbs, the team compiled a 4–5–1 record (3–3 against WAC opponents), finished fourth in the conference, and outscored opponents by a total of 232 to 225.

Schedule

References

UTEP
UTEP Miners football seasons
UTEP Miners football